Indigofera heterantha (syn. Indigofera gerardiana), commonly known as Himalayan indigo, is a species of flowering plant in the legume family Fabaceae. It is native to the northwestern Himalayas of Tibet, in Asia.

It belongs to the same genus as plants used to produce indigo dye.

Description

The Latin specific epithet heterantha means "with various or diverse flowers".

Cultivation
Indigofera heterantha is cultivated as an ornamental plant for a position in bright sunlight. It is drought tolerant and very hardy, down to  However, in colder areas it can be herbaceous, meaning that at the end of the season it dies back down to ground level before regrowing the following year.

This plant has gained the Royal Horticultural Society's Award of Garden Merit.

References

heterantha
Flora of Afghanistan
Flora of Tibet
Flora of the Indian subcontinent
Garden plants of Asia
Drought-tolerant plants